Harald Grobner (born 4 December 1980 in Neunkirchen, Austria) is an Austrian mathematician at the Faculty of Mathematics, University of Vienna. His research focuses on questions of algebra and number theory within the Langlands program.

Career and research 
Grobner studied mathematics, philosophy and classical philology at the University of Vienna, where he graduated in 2005. From 2005 to 2007 he studied for his doctorate in mathematics at the Université Paris VI and the University of Vienna, with Joachim Schwermer as his supervisor.

Grobner undertook research at the Erwin Schrödinger Institute for Mathematical Physics in Vienna and the Max Planck Institute for Mathematics in Bonn and the Faculty for Mathematics at the University of Vienna, before receiving the Schrödinger Grant of the FWF. From 2010 until 2013 he was a guest researcher at the Oklahoma State University, the Max Planck Institute for Mathematics in Bonn and the Institut mathématiques de Jussieu in Paris. He was habilitated by the University of Vienna for his research on automorphic cohomology and the rationality of special L-values in 2014.

In August 2016, Grobner became a permanent member of staff at the Faculty of Mathematics of the University of Vienna. From October 2016 to October 2022 he led the international research programme "Special L-vaues and p-adic L-functions" and, since 2019, the additional research project "Automorphic models and L-values for global algebras", both funded by the Austrian Science Fund.

Since fall 2018, Grobner has also been one of the organisers of the research seminar "Algebra and Number Theory" (formerly called "Number Theory Seminar") at the University of Vienna.

Personal life
Harald Grobner lives in Vienna and is father to a son and a daughter.

Awards 
 Awarded Promotion sub auspiciis praesidentis rei publicae in 2008 by the Austrian president, Heinz Fischer
 Winner of the 2008 "Würdigungspreis" from the Austrian Ministry for Science and Research
 In 2016 he was awarded the Start-Preis by the FWF.

References 

Living people
1980 births
Austrian mathematicians